Jules Joseph Lefebvre (14 March 183624 February 1911) was a French figure painter, educator and theorist.

Early life
Lefebvre was born in Tournan-en-Brie, Seine-et-Marne, on 14 March 1836. He entered the École nationale supérieure des Beaux-Arts in 1852 and was a pupil of Léon Cogniet.

Career
He won the prestigious Prix de Rome with his The Death of Priam in 1861. Between 1855 and 1898, he exhibited 72 portraits in the Paris Salon. Many of his paintings are single figures of beautiful women. Among his best portraits were those of M. L. Reynaud and the Prince Imperial (1874). In 1891, he became a member of the French Académie des Beaux-Arts.

He was professor at the Académie Julian in Paris. Lefebvre is chiefly important as an excellent and sympathetic teacher who numbered many Americans among his 1500 or more pupils. Among his famous students were Fernand Khnopff, Kenyon Cox, Félix Vallotton, Ernst Friedrich von Liphart, Georges Rochegrosse, the Scottish-born landscape painter William Hart, Walter Lofthouse Dean, and Edmund C. Tarbell, who became an American Impressionist painter. Another pupil was the miniaturist Alice Beckington. Jules Benoit-Lévy entered his workshop at the École nationale supérieure des Beaux-Arts.

Lefebvre died in Paris on 24 February 1911 and was buried in the Montmartre Cemetery with a bas-relief depiction of his painting La Vérité on his grave.

Significant milestones

1853 Student at the École des Beaux-Arts
1859 Second place Prix de Rome
1861 His Death of Priam wins the Prix de Rome
1870 Académie Julian professor
1870 Légion d'honneur, Officer, named Commander from 1898
1891 Member of the Académie des Beaux-Arts

Selected works
1861 The Death of Priam (won the Prix de Rome), École nationale supérieure des Beaux-Arts, Paris
1861 Diva Vittoria Colonna
1863 Boy Painting a Tragic Mask
1864 Roman Charity
1865 Portrait d'Antonio, modèle italien
1866 Cornelia, Mother of the Gracchi
1868 Reclining Nude, Musée d'Orsay
1869 Le Réveil de Diane
1869 Portrait of Alexandre Dumas
1870 La Vérité (The Truth) (1870), oil on canvas, Musée d'Orsay, Paris. The painting is contemporary with the first small scale model made by Lefebvre's fellow-Frenchman Frédéric Bartholdi for what became the Statue of Liberty, striking a similar pose, though fully clothed.
1870s Jeune femme à la mandoline (Girl with a Mandolin)
1870 Portrait du Prince Impérial
1872 Pandora
1872 La Cigale, National Gallery of Victoria (Exhibited Salon, Paris, 1872, no. 970; collection of Milton Latham (1827–82), San Francisco, before 1878; by whom sold, New York, 1879; collection of Daniel Catlin, St Louis, Missouri, 1879–1893; by whom gifted to the St Louis Museum of Fine Arts, 1893–1945; deaccessioned and sold, c. 1945; collection of Julian Sterling, Melbourne, by 1984–2005; from whom purchased for the Felton Bequest, 2005.)
1874 Odalisque
1874 Slave Carrying Fruit (Ghent Museum)
1874 Portrait of Eugène Louis Napoléon Bonaparte
1875 Chloé, Young and Jackson Hotel, Melbourne
1876 Mary Magdalene in the Cave, Hermitage Museum, Saint Petersburg
1877 Pandora
1878 Mignon, Metropolitan Museum of Art, New York
1878 Graziella, Metropolitan Museum of Art, New York
1879 Diana
1879 Diana Surprised, Museo Nacional de Bellas Artes, Buenos Aires
1880 Portrait of Julia Foster Ward, Museum of Fine Arts, St. Petersburg, FL
1880 Housemaid, Pera Museum, Istanbul
1881 La Fiametta from Giovanni Boccaccio
1881, Ondine, Museum of Fine Arts, Budapest
1882 Pandora (II)
1882 Japonaise (A Japanese woman)
1883 Psyché
1884 The Feathered Fan
1884 Portrait of Edna Barger, private collection
1890 Lady Godiva
1890 Ophelia
1892 A Daughter of Eve
1892 Judith
1896 Portrait of a Lady (II)
1898 Amor beim Schärfen seiner Pfeile (Love sharpening its arrows)
1901 Alexander Agassiz
1901 Yvonne (formerly Musée du Luxembourg), Portrait of Lefebvre's daughter

Undated works
Clémence Isaure
La Fiancée
Woman with an Orange
Nymph with Morning Glory Flowers
Fleurs des Champs
L'Amour Blessé (Wounded Love)
Mediterranean Beauty
Portrait of a Lady
Portrait of a Woman
Young Woman with Morning Glories in Her Hair

See also
 Samantha Littlefield Huntley, one of his students
Angèle Delasalle, a student at Académie Julian

References

External links

TheARTwerx – Lefebvre Gallery: Comprehensive archive of 141 images
Jules-Joseph-Lefebvre.org: 42 images by Jules Joseph Lefebvre
Art Renewal Centre – Lefebvre Gallery
Jules Joseph Lefebvre, paintingiant.com

1836 births
1911 deaths
People from Tournan-en-Brie
19th-century French painters
French male painters
20th-century French painters
20th-century French male artists
Academic art
Academic staff of the Académie Julian
Prix de Rome for painting
Commandeurs of the Légion d'honneur
Officiers of the Ordre des Palmes Académiques
Burials at Montmartre Cemetery
19th-century French male artists